Rolf Knie (born 16 August 1949 in Bern) is a Swiss painter and actor.

References

20th-century Swiss painters
Swiss male painters
21st-century Swiss painters
21st-century Swiss male artists
1949 births
Living people
20th-century Swiss male artists